Daria Zarivna (born 4 July 1989, Kherson, Ukraine) is a Ukrainian presidential adviser, social activist, spokeswoman and entrepreneur.

Zarivna covers the work of the Coordination Headquarters for Humanitarian and Social Affairs during the 2022 Russian invasion of Ukraine.

She is a spokeswoman of the head of the Office of the President of Ukraine Andriy Yermak. In 2021, she entered the top 100 most influential women in Ukraine according to Focus magazine (34th place).

Early life 

Daria Zarivna was born in Kherson, Ukraine.

She graduated from Stanford University.

Career
In 2014, she launched the online version of the L'Officiel Ukraine magazine, where Zarivna was the editor-in-chief.

Zarivna is a co-founder of the Elevate Conference, and she was also a director at the ANGRY advertising agency.

In July 2018, she founded the Vector media about technology and business.  Also, Zarivna is the co-founder and CEO of the social platform Charitum, an online auction service that helps raise money for various charitable foundations and initiatives, and at the same time is an online social media where articles tell about people in need of help.

In November 2019, she accompanied the Assistant to the President of Ukraine Andriy Yermak during a trip to Donbas.

On February 11, 2020, Daria Zarivna became the press secretary of Andriy Yermak, who was appointed Head of the Office of the President of Ukraine.

In December 2020, Zarivna and her business media Vector launched the podcast “What are you doing?”, in which she communicates with Ukrainian entrepreneurs and creatives.

Daria Zarivna has been responsible for information support of the Coordination Headquarters for Humanitarian and Social Affairs established by President of Ukraine Volodymyr Zelenskyy on March 2, 2022, during the full-scale Russian invasion of Ukraine.

Recognition 

According to the investigation of the LIGA.net media about the Office of the President of Ukraine, Daria Zarivna, together with Mykhailo Podolyak, is responsible for the information direction of the Office.

In June 2021, Zarivna took 34th place in the top 100 most influential women of Ukraine, according to Focus magazine.

References

External links 

Living people
1989 births
People from Kherson
Stanford University alumni
Ukrainian women in business
Ukrainian women activists
21st-century Ukrainian businesspeople
Women magazine editors
Ukrainian women journalists
21st-century Ukrainian journalists
Presidential Administration of Ukraine
Press secretaries
Women podcasters